Roger Sacheverell Coke ( ("cook"); 20 October 1912, Pinxton, nr Alfreton, Derbyshire – 23 October 1972) was an English composer and pianist.

Life
Roger Sacheverell Coke was from a wealthy family. He inherited the family estate of Brookhill Hall, Pinxton at the age of two, when his father, Lieutenant Langton Sacheverell Coke, died at the Battle of Ypres in October 1914. Coke began composing when he was at Eton College, where he was taught by Henry Ley, and was influenced to take up the piano by hearing Benno Moiseiwitsch. Coke's musical interests were strongly supported by his mother and for his 21st birthday, she had outbuildings on the family estate converted to a large music studio and performance space, equipped with a Steinway piano, and with capacity for an audience of several hundred. He pursued his study of composition and the piano seriously. He took piano lessons in London with Mabel Lander (herself a pupil of Theodor Leschetizky and teacher of Princesses Elizabeth and Margaret) and was later a pupil of Alan Bush. He made his debut as a composer-pianist in 1932 with his first piano concerto, and formed the Brookhill Symphony Orchestra in 1940 to play his own and other neglected works.

Coke was homosexual, and a heavy cigarette smoker. Despite his freedom from financial concerns, he suffered from depression. However, in the safe isolation of his studio he composed a large corpus of works, with a strong emphasis on his own instrument, the piano. For the orchestra he wrote three symphonies, six piano concertos, two "vocal concertos" for soprano and orchestra and four symphonic poems. In the chamber music field there are sonatas for cello and for violin, as well as extended works for piano solo, notably the 24 Preludes and 15 Variations and Finale, and around 100 songs. Despite the failure of any publisher to take up his works, some were performed around Britain, and occasionally broadcast. Coke bore the cost of those of his compositions that were published, and often also the costs of performance. Some works were taken up by leading musicians, including pianists Charles Lynch and Moura Lympany, and he counted Moiseiwitsch and Sergei Rachmaninoff amongst his friends.

In November 1959, Coke's three-act opera The Cenci, to his own libretto based on Shelley's verse drama, was given a single performance at the Scala Theatre in London, with the London Symphony Orchestra conducted by Sir Eugene Goossens. The critics were unanimously hostile and dismissive and Coke became seriously depressed. Coke died of a heart attack in 1972. A revival of interest in his work began in 2012 with a performance of his first violin sonata at the English Music Festival in Dorchester Abbey on 2 June 2012. Many of his unpublished manuscripts are held at Chesterfield Library.

Works

Recordings
Violin Sonata No 1 – Rupert Marshall-Luck (violin) and Matthew Rickard (piano) (EM Records, EMRCD018, 2013)
24 Preludes and 15 Variations and Finale for piano – Simon Callaghan (Somm Recordings, SOMMCD 0147, 2015)
Piano Concertos No 3, No 4 and No 5 (surviving slow movement) – Simon Callaghan (piano), Martyn Brabbins, BBC Scottish Symphony Orchestra (Hyperion Records, CDA68173, 2017)
 Cello Sonatas, Raphael Wallfisch (cello), Simon Callaghan (piano) (Lyrita SRCD.384, 2020)

References

1912 births
1972 deaths
20th-century British male musicians
20th-century classical composers
20th-century classical pianists
20th-century English composers
20th-century English LGBT people
British male pianists
English classical composers
English classical pianists
English male classical composers
LGBT classical composers
Male classical pianists
People from Alfreton
People from Pinxton